Richard Samuel Jackson (born July 22, 1941) is a former American football player. He played college football for Southern University. Jackson played for the American Football League (AFL)'s Oakland Raiders in 1966 and Denver Broncos from 1967 through 1969, remaining with the Broncos in 1970 through 1971 after their post-merger transition to the National Football League (NFL), and the Cleveland Browns in 1972. Jackson was All-Pro in 1969 and 1970.

Early years and college career 
Jackson was born in New Orleans, Louisiana on July 22, 1941. He grew up in a rough area in Algiers, New Orleans and attended L.B. Landry High School where he played football for legendary coach Felix James. He showed outstanding skills and determination as a 210-pound defensive end and also ended up running track when one of the school’s sprinters beat him in a 100-yard foot race. He spent the entire school year working on his speed. When track season came around, Jackson bested that sprinter in a rematch and earned a spot on the track team. He threw the discus, javelin and shot, as well as anchoring relay teams and running the 220-yard dash. 

Upon graduating Landry, Jackson enrolled at Southern University in nearby Baton Rouge. In college, he was a standout end on both sides of the ball, lettered in track and also won the NAIA Shot-Put competition in 1962. His 58'1" heave in 1964 is still a Louisiana collegiate record.

Pro career

Oakland Raiders 
After college, Jackson went undrafted and signed with the AFL Oakland Raiders as a Free Agent in 1965 and he played five games at Linebacker in 1966 for Oakland. The Broncos acquired him at the beginning of training camp in 1967 when Broncos head coach Lou Saban sent All-Pro wide receiver Lionel Taylor and another player to the Raiders in exchange for Jackson and two other players.

Denver Broncos 
The Broncos switched him to Defensive End and Jackson showed the quickness that was to become his trademark in professional football. He played for the AFL Denver Broncos from 1967 through 1969, with 10 sacks in ‘68 and a career high 11 in ‘69. Jackson racked up another 10 Sacks in 1970 as the AFL and NFL merged. Jackson was the first Bronco to be named to the All-NFL first team in 1970 and was a starter in the Pro Bowl that year. By all reckoning, he started 52 of 67 games in 5.5 years with the Broncos from 1967-72. 

During his time in the NFL, Jackson's nickname was "Tombstone," and he became famous for moves such as the "head slap" and the "halo spinner" which he used to subdue opposing offensive linemen. In Lyle Alzado's book "Mile High" he recalled Jackson as the toughest man he'd ever met, and told the story of Jackson breaking the helmet of Green Bay Packers offensive tackle Bill Hayhoe with a head slap.

Jackson recorded 10 sacks in both 1968 and 1970 and posted a career-high total of 11 in 1969. He was named 1st Team All-AFL by the AP, Pro Football Weekly, and UPI at the conclusion of the 1968 season and by the AP, NEA, New York Daily News, Pro Football Weekly, The Sporting News, and UPI at the end of the 1969 season. He was also a unanimous 1st Team All-NFL choice in 1970.

Legacy 
Jackson's career was cut short by a severe knee injury midway through the 1971 season. He finished with an unofficial total of 43 sacks, 31 of which came during the three-season period of 1968 to 1970. Despite the shortened career, Sports Illustrated's football expert, Paul Zimmerman, said that Tombstone Jackson was perhaps the finest overall defensive end and pass rusher he ever saw, a surefire Hall of Famer if he would have had a longer playing career, in a bigger media market.

Jackson wore number 87 with the Broncos and was part of the inaugural class of inductees into the Denver Broncos' "Ring of Fame". He was inducted in 1984 along with safety Goose Gonsoulin, running back Floyd Little, and wide receiver Lionel Taylor. He was voted to the Colorado Sports Hall of Fame in 1975.

In 2015, the Professional Football Researchers Association named Jackson to the PRFA Hall of Very Good Class of 2015.

See also
 List of American Football League players

References

1941 births
Living people
American football defensive ends
American football linebackers
Cleveland Browns players
Denver Broncos (AFL) players
Denver Broncos players
Oakland Raiders players
Southern Jaguars football players
American Conference Pro Bowl players
American Football League All-Star players
Players of American football from New Orleans
American Football League players